Gerhard von Rad (21 October 1901 – 31 October 1971) was a German academic, Old Testament scholar, Lutheran theologian, exegete, and professor at the University of Heidelberg.

Early life, education, career

Gerhard von Rad was born in Nuremberg, Bavaria, to Lutheran parents. His family were part of the patrician class. He was educated at the University of Erlangen and further at the University of Tübingen.

In 1925, he became a curate in the Lutheran Landeskirche (i.e. the church in the federal state) of Bavaria. Later, he taught at the University of Erlangen in 1929 as tutor. In 1930 he was a privatdozent at the University of Leipzig. From 1934 to 1945 he served as a professor at the University of Jena and later at the University of Göttingen from 1945 to 1949. After that, he became Professor of Old Testament at the Ruprecht Karl University of Heidelberg in the state of Baden-Württemberg and taught there until his death in 1971.

He was conferred honorary doctorates from the University of Lund, Sweden and the University of Wales, United Kingdom.

Oral tradition and the Pentateuch

Along with Martin Noth, Gerhard von Rad applied form criticism, originated by Hermann Gunkel, to the documentary hypothesis.

Nazi Germany's anti-Semitism led to an "anti-Old Testament" bias among German scholars. Disturbed by this, von Rad turned to the study of the Old Testament and gradually started to bring back its message.
 
His lively papers achieved a renewal of interest and research in Old Testament studies. Along with Martin Noth, he applied research into the Pentateuch's oral tradition to the explanation of its origin.

In 1960, von Rad traveled to the United States where he was a visiting scholar at Princeton Theological Seminary. He was greatly influential during this period. While at Princeton, he took on Richard A. Jensen as an understudy, who would also further his research and application.

Death

Gerhard von Rad and his wife are buried in Heidelberg's   On their gravestone is minimalist artwork depicting Jonah emerging from the great fish, an Old Testament symbol of resurrection.

Selected works

Publications 
The Problem of the Hexateuch and other essays 
Genesis: A Commentary (Old Testament Library) 
Deuteronomy: A Commentary (Old Testament Library) 
Studies in Deuteronomy (Studies in Biblical theology) ASIN B0007JWYNA
Old Testament Theology 
Old Testament Theology, One-Volume Edition 
The Message of the Prophets: Old Testament Theology 
Holy War in Ancient Israel 
Das Alte Testament Deutsch (ATD), Tlbd.2/4, Das erste Buch Mose, Genesis  (This textbook series of detailed theological commentaries on individual books of the bible translates as "The Old Testament [in] German"; the volume is on the book of Genesis)
God at work in Israel 
Biblical interpretations in preaching 
Gottes Wirken in Israel: Vorträge zum Alten Testament  ("God's acting in Israel: [public] lectures on the Old Testament")
Wisdom in Israel  (translation of the German book below ?)
The message of the prophets ASIN B0006C6BA0
Weisheit in Israel ASIN B000E1Q3CY ("Wisdom in Israel")
Theologie des Alten Testaments (Einführung in die evangelische Theologie) ASIN B0007JBBTI ("Theology of the Old Testament"/ series title: "Introduction into 'evangelisch'[e] theology" ["evangelisch" in German is used in a similar sense as "Protestant" in English, but has other connotations; hence it is not directly translatable; it usually refers to lutheran or closely related faith and theology, or Christians adhering to it)
Basileia (Bible Key Words from Gerhard Kittel's Theologisches Wörterbuch zum Neuen Testament) ASIN B000BGT0RW
Theologie des Alten Testaments, Bd. 2.  (vol.2 of the title above)
Kaiser Taschenbücher, Bd.1, Theologie des Alten Testaments. Die Theologie der geschichtlichen Überlieferungen Israels.  ("Kaiser [publisher's name] pocketbooks, vol.1, "Theology of the Old Testament. Theology of the historical tradition of Israel")
Das Alte Testament Deutsch (ATD), Tlbd.8 : Das fünfte Buch Mose (Deuteronomium)  (the volume on the book Deuteronomium of the series mentioned above)
Erinnerungen aus der Kriegsgefangenschaft, Frühjahr 1945  ("Memories of a prisoner of war, spring 1945")
Predigt-Meditationen  ("Sermon meditations")
Eirene (Pocket crammer series) ASIN B0007FP9LI
Origin of the concept of the day of Yahweh ASIN B0007JF2HA
 From Genesis to Chronicles: Explorations in Old Testament Theology  (review)

Scholarly impact
 Victor Premasagar, a Cambridge tripos and past Principal of the Andhra Christian Theological College, Secunderabad, India in introducing critical methods and tools used in Biblical interpretation writes about von Rad as: 
Prof. Premasagar concludes by saying that 
 Henning Graf Reventlow of Ruhr University, North Rhine-Westphalia, Germany in introducing a book by von Rad, makes the following observations: 
 Gerhard Hasel of the Seventh-day Adventist Theological Seminary of Andrews University, Michigan, United States in writing about the approaches to OT studies, mentions von Rad with the words...., 
 John H. Hayes, Professor at Candler School of Theology of the Emory University in Atlanta, United States writes about von Rad... 
 G. Henton Davies, past Principal, Regent's Park College, a Permanent Private Hall of Oxford University, Oxford, England, writes about von Rad thus

See also 
 Book of Deuteronomy
 Biblical Criticism, Form Criticism
 Martin Noth
 Deuteronomistic History and Deuteronomist
 Dr. Klaus Koch, D.D., Professor Emeritus of Old Testament and History of the Ancient near East Religions at the University of Hamburg, Hamburg, Germany
Richard A. Jensen former apprentice of Gerhard von Rad
 Andhra Christian Theological College, Secunderabad, Andhra Pradesh, India
 Books of Chronicles

References
Notes

Further reading
 
 
 
 
 

The July 2008 issue of Interpretation: a Journal of Bible and Theology has as its subject "Gerhard von Rad: Theologian of the Church." See especially:
 Manfred Oeming, "Gerhard von Rad as a Theologian of the Church" p. 229
 Martin Hauger, "On the Significance of Preaching in the Theology and Work of Gerhard von Rad" p. 278
 Bernard M. Levinson, "Reading the Bible in Nazi Germany: Gerhard von Rad's Attempt to Reclaim the Old Testament for the Church" p. 238
 

1901 births
1971 deaths
20th-century German male writers
20th-century German Protestant theologians
Bible commentators
German male non-fiction writers
German biblical scholars
German Lutheran theologians
Academic staff of Heidelberg University
Academic staff of Leipzig University
Lutheran biblical scholars
Old Testament scholars
Writers from Nuremberg
People from the Kingdom of Bavaria
Protestants in the German Resistance
Recipients of the Pour le Mérite (civil class)
University of Erlangen-Nuremberg alumni
Academic staff of the University of Erlangen-Nuremberg
Academic staff of the University of Göttingen
Academic staff of the University of Jena
University of Tübingen alumni
Von Rad family
20th-century Lutherans